Bel Arjona, born on 10 May 1981 in Madrid, is a Spanish singer and Songwriter. Best known is Spain as Belén Arjona, the singer was nominated in 2006 the Latin Grammy Awards for Best Rock Solo Vocal Album.

Biography
Bel Arjona (known in Spain as Belen Arjona) is a Spanish singer and songwriter, Latin Grammy Awards nominee for Best Rock Solo Vocal Album in 2006.

The singer had a prominent career in the Spanish market until 2008, followed by a purposeful industry hiatus where side projects kept developed nevertheless.

The singer's most prominent collaborations include bands such as Maná and Efecto Mariposa.

Discography

Álbumes 
 2003: O te mueves o caducas
 2004: O te mueves o caducas (Edición especial) 
 2005: Infinito (álbum de Belén Arjona)
 2008: Alas en mis pies
 2019: En grabación

Singles 
{| class="wikitable"
! Año
! width="260" | Canción
! width="260" | Álbum
|-
|2003
|"O te mueves o caducas"
|O te mueves o caducas
|-
|2003
|"Me voy de fiesta"
|O te mueves o caducas
|-
|2003
|"Si no estás"
|O te mueves o caducas
|-
|2003
|"Sangre en la nevera"
|O te mueves o caducas
|-
|2004
|"Vivir sin aire" (dúo con Fher Olvera de Maná)
|O te mueves o caducas (Edición especial)
|-
|2005
|"Infinito"
|Infinito
|-
|2005
|"No habrá más perdón"
|Infinito
|-
|2006
|"Sola otra vez"
|Infinito
|-
|2007
|"La sombra"
|Alas en mis pies
|-
|2008
|"Tú no te das cuenta"
|Alas en mis pies
|-
|2011
|"We belong here"
|Best Not to Say It
|-
|2019
|En grabación
|TBD'
|}

 Collaborations 

 Videoclips 

 DVD 
 2004: O te mueves o caducas (Edición Especial)''

References

Links 

 Website Oficial
 Instagram

1981 births
Living people
Singers from Madrid
University of Salamanca alumni
21st-century Spanish singers
21st-century Spanish women singers